The Galerie Maeght is a gallery of modern art in Paris, France, and Barcelona, Catalonia, Spain. The gallery was founded in 1936 in Cannes. The Paris gallery was started in 1946 by Aimé Maeght. The artists exhibited are mainly from France and Spain.

History 
The Maeght gallery was inaugurated with the Henri Matisse exhibition in December 1945 in Paris. From 1946, Bonnard, Braque, Marchand, Rouault, Baya exhibited for the first time at the Parisian gallery. In 1949, Andry-Farcy exhibited his collection of abstract art from the Grenoble museum there during the exhibition The First Masters of Abstract Art.

In 1956, Paule and Adrien Maeght opened their own gallery at 42, rue du Bac in Paris, with an exhibition by Alberto Giacometti. The new generation of “Maeght” artists is exhibited there: Kelly, Cortot, Bazaine, Derain, Tal-Coat, Palazuelo, Chillida, Ubac, Fiedler. They were joined in 1966 by Bacon, Riopelle, Tàpies, Rebeyrolle, Bury, Adami, Monory.

In 1964, Adrien Maeght created the ARTE printing works in the heart of Paris, where all Maeght editions have been produced ever since. With more than 12,000 titles published, Maeght Éditeur is recognized as the most important publisher of lithographs and engravings in the world.

Today, the Maeght gallery and the editions are managed by Isabelle Maeght. The exhibitions allow visitors and collectors to find the works of historical artists such as Miró, Calder, Braque, Matisse, Chagall, Tàpies, Chillida, Gasiorowski, Rebeyrolle, Monory, Del Re, Depin, Doerflinger, Couturier, Levy.

References

External links 
 Official website

1936 establishments in France
Art museums and galleries in France
Buildings and structures in Paris
Tourist attractions in Paris
Modern art museums in France
Art galleries established in 1936
Modern art museums in Spain